Nemanja Antonov (born 6 May 1995) is a Serbian professional footballer who plays for Hungarian club Újpest as a left-back.

Club career
Born in Pančevo, Antonov originating from the local neighbourhood Kačarevo, where he grown up. He started out at OFK Beograd, making his senior debuts in the 2012–13 season. He remained with the club for two more seasons, before transferring to Swiss club Grasshoppers in July 2015.

On 30 August 2017, Antonov was transferred to Partizan on a season-long loan.

On 25 September 2020, he joined Újpest in Hungary.

International career
Antonov represented Serbia at the 2014 UEFA Under-19 Championship, as the team was eliminated in the semi-final by Portugal. He was also a member of the team that won the 2015 FIFA U-20 World Cup.

Subsequently, Antonov was a member of the team at the 2017 UEFA European Under-21 Championship.

Statistics

Honours

Club
Partizan
 Serbian Cup: 2017–18

Újpest
 Magyar Kupa: 2020–21

International
Serbia
 FIFA U-20 World Cup: 2015

References

External links
 
 
 

1995 births
Sportspeople from Pančevo
Living people
Serbian footballers
Serbia youth international footballers
Serbia under-21 international footballers
Association football defenders
OFK Beograd players
Grasshopper Club Zürich players
FK Partizan players
Royal Excel Mouscron players
Újpest FC players
Serbian SuperLiga players
Swiss Super League players
Belgian Pro League players
Nemzeti Bajnokság I players
Serbian expatriate footballers
Expatriate footballers in Switzerland
Serbian expatriate sportspeople in Switzerland
Expatriate footballers in Belgium
Serbian expatriate sportspeople in Belgium
Expatriate footballers in Hungary
Serbian expatriate sportspeople in Hungary
Serbian people of Russian descent